Margaret Pellegrini ( Williams; September 23, 1923 – August 7, 2013) was an American actress, vaudeville performer and dancer, best known for playing one of the Munchkins from the 1939 film The Wizard of Oz. Until her death in 2013, she was one of the three surviving munchkins, the other two being Jerry Maren and Ruth Robinson Duccini.

Biography 
Pellegrini was born Margaret Williams in Tuscumbia, Alabama. When she was helping a relative in a potato chip booth at the Tennessee State Fair, a group of little people came by and asked if she wanted to join their show, Henry Kramer's Midgets. "At that time I didn't think I was a midget," says Pellegrini (who then stood about ). In the film, Pellegrini played a "sleepyhead" flower pot and Munchkin villager. After the film, she married Willie Pellegrini (an average-sized ex-fighter) and had two children. Through the years, Pellegrini frequently appeared at surviving Munchkins of Oz festivities.

Munchkins Walk of fame 

Pellegrini was present on November 21, 2007, when the remaining Munchkins were given a star on the Hollywood Walk of Fame. She was also named the Grand Marshal of this year's annual "Oz-Stravaganza" parade in Chittenango, New York, but health issues prevented her from attending. Near the time of her death, she was described as a widowed great-great-grandmother living in Glendale, Arizona, with a room in her house devoted to her treasured Oz collectibles.

Death
Pellegrini died on August 7, 2013, in Glendale, Arizona, due to complications from a stroke she had two days earlier. She outlived every major cast member of The Wizard of Oz. She was 89. Her burial is at Holy Cross Cemetery in Avondale, Arizona.

Filmography

References

External links

Actors with dwarfism
Actresses from Alabama
American film actresses
People from Tuscumbia, Alabama
1923 births
20th-century American actresses
2013 deaths
Vaudeville performers
21st-century American women